For lists of battleships of the Royal Navy see:

List of ships of the line of the Royal Navy
List of ironclads of the Royal Navy
List of pre-dreadnought battleships of the Royal Navy
List of dreadnought battleships of the Royal Navy
List of battlecruisers of the Royal Navy

See also
For earlier examples see "Great ships" and "First rate ships" at List of early warships of the English navy